The Private Life of Pyotr Vinogradov is a 1934 Soviet comedy film directed by Aleksandr Macheret.

Plot 
The film tells about the inventor Petra Vinogradov, who studies in the evening university and works at the car factory. He has a girlfriend, but the main character in secret from her begins to take care of another girl and gets into various funny situations.

Cast 
 Boris Livanov as Pyotr Vinogradov (as B.N. Livanov)
 V. Tsishevsky
 Konstantin Gradopolov	
 Galina Pashkova
 Nadezhda Ardi

References

External links 

1934 films
1930s Russian-language films
Soviet black-and-white films
Soviet comedy films
1934 comedy films